Qeshlaq Amir Khanlu-ye Hajji Shakar (also Romanized as Qeshlāq Amīr Khānlū-ye Ḩājjī Shakar; also known as Qeshlāq Amīr Khānlū-ye Ḩājj Shakar) is a village in Mahmudabad Rural District, Tazeh Kand District, Parsabad County, Ardabil Province, Iran. At the 2006 census, its population was 182, in 41 families.

References 

Towns and villages in Parsabad County